Roi fainéant, literally "do-nothing king", is a French term primarily used to refer to the later kings of the Merovingian dynasty after they seemed to have lost their initial powers of dominion. It is usually applied to those Frankish rulers approximately from the death of Dagobert I in 639 AD (or, alternatively, from the accession of Theuderic III in 673) until the deposition of Childeric III in favour of Pepin the Short in 751. 

The appellation goes back to Einhard, who is most notably the author of Vita Karoli Magni, the biographer of Charlemagne; he described the later Merovingian kings as kings "in nothing but in name":

During the century of the rois fainéants, the Merovingian kings were increasingly dominated by their mayors of the palace, in the 6th century the office of the manager of the royal household, but in the 7th increasingly the real "power behind the throne" who limited the role of the king to an essentially ceremonial office.

The last Carolingian ruler, Louis V of France, was also in his turn nicknamed le Fainéant ("the Do-Nothing"), because his effective rule was limited to the region around Laon.

References 

M. Christian Pfirter, "La Gallia sotto i franchi merovingi: vicende storiche" in Storia del mondo medioevale, vol. I, 1999, pp. 688-711.
Marie-Nicolas Bouillet, Alexis Chassang,  "Rois fainéants" in Dictionnaire universel d’histoire et de géographie, 1878. 
Jean Verseuil, Les rois fainéants - De Dagobert à Pépin, Paris, 1946.